José Ignacio Ceniceros González (born 11 May 1956) is a Spanish politician and member of the People's Party (PP). Ceniceros, who previously held the position of President of the Parliament of La Rioja from 1999 to 2015, served as the President of La Rioja from 2015 to 2019.

Ceniceros' People's Party (PP) had retained a slim majority in the 2015 Riojan regional election on 24 May 2015, but lost five seats. Ceniceros listed the creation of higher quality jobs for Riojans as his top priority during his tenure as president. In the 2019 Riojan regional election, PP lost three seats and the position as the largest party in the Parliament of La Rioja.

References

1956 births
Presidents of La Rioja (Spain)
Presidents of the Parliament of La Rioja (Spain)
People's Party (Spain) politicians
Living people
Politicians from La Rioja
Spanish municipal councillors
Members of the 4th Parliament of La Rioja (Spain)
Members of the 5th Parliament of La Rioja (Spain)
Members of the 6th Parliament of La Rioja (Spain)
Members of the 7th Parliament of La Rioja (Spain)
Members of the 8th Parliament of La Rioja (Spain)
Members of the 9th Parliament of La Rioja (Spain)
Members of the 10th Parliament of La Rioja (Spain)